Adam Mitchell (born December 1, 1982) is a Canadian-German professional ice hockey player. He is currently playing for Löwen Frankfurt in the DEL2. Born in Port Elgin, Ontario, he was granted German citizenship in September 2014.

Playing career
Mitchell played collegiately at Colgate University, serving as team captain as a senior. Upon graduation in 2005, he turned pro and started his overseas career in Germany. After spending two and a half years with minor league team EV Landsberg, he was picked up by the Hannover Scorpions of the German top-flight Deutsche Eishockey Liga (DEL) in December 2007. He won the German championship with the Scorpions in 2010.

Prior to the 2011-12 campaign, he joined fellow DEL team Adler Mannheim on a two-year deal. On June 20, 2013, out of contract from Adler Mannheim, Mitchell was signed to a one-year contract with the Hamburg Freezers. He eventually stayed with the Freezers until May 2016, when the organization folded. On June 2, 2016, Mitchell inked a deal with fellow DEL club Straubing Tigers.

References

External links

1982 births
Living people
Adler Mannheim players
Canadian ice hockey right wingers
Hamburg Freezers players
Hannover Scorpions players
People from Bruce County
Ice hockey people from Ontario
Straubing Tigers players
Löwen Frankfurt players
Canadian expatriate ice hockey players in Germany